= Barsin =

- Location within Pakistan
- Coordinates: 34.05°N 73.07°E
- Country: Pakistan
- Province: Khyber Pakhtunkhwa
- Elevation: 1,112 m (3,648 ft)
- Time zone: UTC+5 (PST)

Barsin is a village in Khyber Pakhtunkhwa province of Pakistan. It is located at 34°5'45N 73°7'30E with an altitude of 1112 metres (3651 feet).
